School Was My Hustle is the first studio album from Kidz in the Hall, a Chicago hip hop duo. It was the first release from a reactivated Rawkus Records, after its catalog was purchased by Universal Music Group.

Track listing
"Hustler's Intro" – 0:57
"Ritalin" – 1:57
"Wassup Jo'" – 3:52
Contains a sample from "Dream Journey" by Bob James
"Wheelz Fall Off ('06 Til)" – 3:44
"Ms. Juanita" – 3:57
"Cruise Control" – 3:17
"Go Ill" – 4:36
Contains a sample from "The Spic" by Alan Tew
"Dumbass Tales" – 3:46
Contains a sample from "Rockin' You Eternally" by Leon Ware
"Don't Stop" – 3:40
"Move on Up" featuring Mike Payne – 4:24
Contains a sample from "Am I Black Enough for You?" by Billy Paul
"Hypocrite" – 4:39
"Day By Day" / "We Almost Lost" (Hidden Track) – 8:19

References

Kidz in the Hall albums
2006 albums
Rawkus Records albums
Albums produced by Double-O